Algia fasciata is a species of brush-footed butterfly found in Asia.

Subspecies
Algia fasciata fasciata (southern Burma to Peninsular Malaya and Sumatra)
Algia fasciata palloris (Fruhstorfer, 1900) (Palawan)
Algia fasciata bilbilis (Fruhstorfer, 1912) (Java)
Algia fasciata ortopia (Fruhstorfer, 1912) (the Philippines)

References
"Algia Herrich-Schäffer, 1864" at Markku Savela's Lepidoptera and Some Other Life Forms

Vagrantini
Butterflies of Java
Butterflies of Indochina
Butterflies described in 1860
Butterflies of Asia
Taxa named by Baron Cajetan von Felder
Taxa named by Rudolf Felder